Terralonus is a genus of American jumping spiders that was first described by Wayne Paul Maddison in 1996.

Species
 it contains seven species, found only in the United States:
Terralonus banksi (Roewer, 1951) – USA
Terralonus californicus (Peckham & Peckham, 1888) – USA
Terralonus fraternus (Banks, 1932) – USA
Terralonus mylothrus (Chamberlin, 1925) (type) – USA
Terralonus shaferi (Gertsch & Riechert, 1976) – USA
Terralonus unicus (Chamberlin & Gertsch, 1930) – USA
Terralonus versicolor (Peckham & Peckham, 1909) – USA

References

External links
 

Salticidae
Salticidae genera
Spiders of the United States